Dilling Station is a former railway station on the Østfold Line, located at Dilling in Rygge, Norway.

References

Railway stations in Østfold
Railway stations on the Østfold Line
Railway stations opened in 1879
1879 establishments in Norway
Disused railway stations in Norway

Year of disestablishment missing
Rygge